Kigoma is a city and lake port in Kigoma-Ujiji District in Tanzania, on the northeastern shores of Lake Tanganyika and close to the border with Burundi and The Democratic Republic of the Congo. It serves as the capital for the surrounding Kigoma Region and has a population of 215,458 (2012 census).

Transport

Maritime transport

Kigoma is one of the busiest ports on northeastern Lake Tanganyika since historically it was the only one that had a functioning railway connection (the one at Kalemie in The Democratic Republic of the Congo is not operational at the moment), a direct link to the ocean port at Dar es Salaam. This may threaten the economic growth of the port. In May 2007 the Tanzanian Government announced a plan to create an economic zone at the port to stimulate trade and to ensure stable economic growth of the Port for the government in Power in 2015 and 2020.

The MV Liemba sails every week from Kigoma to Mpulungu in Zambia at the southern tip of Lake Tanganyika, stopping at a number of other lakeside towns in Tanzania on the way. The MV Mwongozo sails from Kigoma to Baraka, Uvira and Bujumbura at the northern tip of the lake, although it is not working currently. There are other ships from Congo and Burundi that sail to Kigoma Port every week.

Road
Current road connections to and from Kigoma are improving. However, travellers should be advised to take extra precautions when travelling. A gravel road links the town northeast to the national road network, and earth tracks link north to Burundi and southeast to Sumbawanga.

Railway

The Central Line of the Tanzania Railways Corporation runs from Kigoma to the Port of Dar es Salaam on to the Indian Ocean coast via Tabora and Dodoma. It was completed in 1915 when Kigoma was part of German East Africa. In Tabora, there is a connection to Mwanza on Lake Victoria, with ferry connections to other Tanzanian lakeshore places, and formerly Uganda. At Tabora, you can also travel by train to Mpanda. For a time in early 2010, the line was closed but service has apparently been restored.

Airport
The city is served by Kigoma Airport which has scheduled service to Bujumbura and Dar es Salaam.

Climate 
Kigoma has a tropical savanna climate (Köppen Aw) with a wet season between November and April.

References

Further reading

External links

Populated places in Kigoma Region
Regional capitals in Tanzania
Populated places on Lake Tanganyika
Cities in the Great Rift Valley